The Frauen-Bundesliga 2004–05 was the 15th season of the Frauen-Bundesliga, Germany's premier football league. It began on 5 September 2004 and ended on 10 May 2005.

Final standings

Results

Top scorers

References

2004-05
Ger
1
Women1